Laguna Seca Raceway (branded as WeatherTech Raceway Laguna Seca, and previously Mazda Raceway Laguna Seca) is a paved road racing track in central California used for both auto racing and motorcycle racing, built in 1957 near both Salinas and Monterey, California, United States.

Its eleven turns are highlighted by the circuit's signature turn, the downhill-plunging "Corkscrew" at Turns 8 and 8A. A variety of racing, exhibition, and entertainment events are held at the raceway, ranging from superkarts to sports car racing to music festivals. Laguna Seca is classified as an FIA Grade Two circuit.

The name Laguna Seca is Spanish for dry lagoon:  the area where the track now lies was once a lake, and the course was built around the dry lake bed. After the course was reconfigured, two artificial ponds were added.

History 

The earliest development of the local area occurred in 1867 with the founding of the nearby Laguna Seca Ranch, which has operated continuously for 140 years with grazing and equestrian uses.

The track was built in 1957 at a cost of $1.5 million raised from local businesses and individuals on part of the US Army's Fort Ord (a maneuver area and field artillery target range) after the nearby Pebble Beach Road Races were abandoned for being too dangerous. In 1974 the property was deeded over to the Monterey County Parks Department and continues to be part of the park system.

The first race, held on November 9, 1957, was won by Pete Lovely driving a Ferrari. In the intervening years, the track has hosted USRRC, Can-Am, Trans-Am, Formula 5000, IMSA GT, CART, Indy Car, American Le Mans Series, Grand American, Monterey Historic Automobile Races, Speed World Challenge, AMA (American Motorcyclist Association), WSBK Superbike World Championship and MotoGP motorcycle races (but 125/Moto3 and 250/Moto2 are not admitted).

The day-to-day operations of the track, along with the management and promotion of major racing events, are now handled by A&D Narigi Consulting, LLC. John V. Narigi is the General Manager and President. Until January 1, 2020, it was managed by the Sports Car Racing Association of the Monterey Peninsula (SCRAMP), which is a non-profit organization. With oversight by a board of local residents, SCRAMP operates with a professional staff on-site with the goal of generating income through the operations of the racetrack which is then redistributed to local charities.

The track itself has undergone significant changes over the past two decades to meet evolving safety homologation requirements of the Fédération Internationale de Motocyclisme (FIM), Fédération Internationale de l'Automobile (FIA) and other sanctioning bodies. Changes include the addition of the entire infield area in 1988 (present-day turns 3, 4, and 5, eliminating the straight that started at present-day turn 2 and ended at present-day turn 5) extending the track from its original  length to meet the minimum-track-length criteria of the FIM for MotoGP events, plus the more recent relocation of pedestrian bridges and embankments, and the expansion of gravel pits outside turns 1, 2, 5, 6, 8, 9, 10 for additional runoff. The original media center was demolished in 2006 to make way for additional run-off room in Turn 1. Also in 2006, the 'hump' at the top of the Rahal Straight was flattened to accommodate the MotoGP riders, though some claim that this increases the wind effects that can perturb a race motorcycle. Remnants of the old configuration can still be seen from the parking lot between turns two and five. They are found underneath a road leading to the parking area for entrant trailers and RVs.

The famous Turn 8 and 8A combination, popularly referred to as 'the Corkscrew', is considered one of the motorsport world's most challenging turns, due to the  drop in elevation as well as its blind crest and apex on the uphill approach.

Turn 2, with its difficult and technical double-apex, has been renamed the 'Andretti Hairpin', in honor of former Formula 1 World Champion Mario Andretti, while Turn 9 has been renamed 'Rainey Curve' in honor of 500cc Grand Prix motorcycle racing World Champion Wayne Rainey, a resident of nearby Salinas, California. Also, the straight that runs between Turn 6 and Turn 7 has been renamed the 'Rahal Straight' after four-time consecutive Champ Car race winner Bobby Rahal.

A Champ Car World Series weekend had been a prominent event from 1983 through 2004, when its spot on the calendar was shifted to the San Jose Grand Prix. On the last lap of the 1996 CART race, Alex Zanardi passed Bryan Herta on the inside of the Corkscrew to take the victory. Uruguayan driver Gonzalo Rodríguez died during the practice session of the 1999 CART race after crashing at the same corner. Because of the incident, runoff was installed at the end of the Rahal Straight.

Champ Car announced on September 11, 2007, that they would be returning the Northern California race to Laguna Seca from San Jose over the May 16–18 weekend in 2008.  But the subsequent merger of Champ Car and IndyCar resulted in the race being canceled.  On July 17, 2018, IndyCar announced a return of IndyCars to Laguna Seca, with the event to be held the weekend of Sept. 20–22, 2019.

The track is also the site of the annual Rolex Monterey Motorsports Reunion, formerly known as the Monterey Historic Automobile Races. The event features an extraordinarily eclectic mixture of race cars on the course. Each year features a different marque.  Considered one of the two greatest historic racing events (along with the Goodwood Festival in England), attendance often rivals, or surpasses the professional racing events listed above.

There are many permanent dry and hook-up camping facilities located at the raceway, which are available year-round as part of the Laguna Seca Recreation Area, the county park in which the racetrack is set.

The track's primary corporate sponsor is WeatherTech which began in April 2018. As part of the sponsorship, the track is now officially referred to as WeatherTech Raceway Laguna Seca. Previously, the sponsorship belonged to Mazda for 17 years with the track being known as Mazda Raceway Laguna Seca.

A 2015 study by California State University, Monterey Bay and commissioned by SCRAMP states that the raceway generated $62.1 million (2015 USD) to the Monterey County economy and $5.2 million in state and local taxes.

Racing 
Major events each year include the US round of the World Superbike Championship (held in conjunction with a round of the MotoAmerica championship), Monterey Sports Car Championships (WeatherTech SportsCar Championship), and the Monterey Historics for classic racecars.

Lap records
On August 20, 2006, Toyota F1 test driver Ricardo Zonta set an unofficial lap record of 1:06.309. The previous record time was 1:07.722, set by Hélio Castroneves in a Penske Champ Car during qualifying for the 2000 CART Honda Grand Prix of Monterey. The unofficial record was re-taken by a Champ Car on March 10, 2007, by Sébastien Bourdais, who lapped in 1'05.880 during Champ Car Spring Training. The unofficial record was again re-taken by a Formula One car on May 19, 2012, by Marc Gené, who lapped in 1'05.786 in a Ferrari F2003-GA during the 2012 Ferrari Racing Days.

Officially, Castroneves is still the record-holder as the times of Zonta, Bourdais and Gené were set during exhibition and testing sessions, and official records can only be set in race conditions (either in practice, qualifying, or during a race).

At the 2008 Monterey Sports Car Championships, David Brabham set a pole position time of 1:10.103 in a Le Mans Prototype.

The fastest lap at the 2006 A1GP race was 1:17.951, set by Nicolas Lapierre.

At the 2012 United States motorcycle Grand Prix, Jorge Lorenzo set a pole time of 1:20.554 on the Yamaha. During the 2014 Superbike World Championship season, Tom Sykes set a time of 1:21.811 on the Kawasaki.

The 2019 McLaren Senna holds the current production car lap record. Driver Randy Pobst piloted the unmodified McLaren to a 1:27.62 lap time during MotorTrend's 2019 best driver car award testing.

The 2016 Porsche 911 GT2 RS previously held the current unofficial production car lap record with 1:28.30.

The Porsche 918 Spyder held the previous unofficial production car lap record with 1:29.89.

A Mission Motors Mission R, ridden by Steve Rapp, previously held the outright EV lap record with a time of 1:31.376. This was set during qualifying for the 2011 FIM e-Power International Championship/TTXGP World Series race.

In 2018, Earl Bamber clocked an unofficial best lap time of 1:07 around Laguna Seca in the Porsche 919 EVO, despite not intentionally trying to set a lap record.

A McLaren MP4/13, driven by Pato O'Ward set an unofficial lap time of 1:10.24 at the 2021 Velocity Invitational festival.

All-time lap records

Race Lap Records
The fastest unofficial all-time track record set during a race weekend is 1:07.722, set by Hélio Castroneves during qualifying for the 2000 Shell 300 Monterey Grand Prix. As of May 2022, the fastest official race lap records at Laguna Seca for different classes are listed as:

Other use

Automotive
When not being used by the major events the track can be rented.  Approximately twice a year the Sports Car Club of America holds regional club races for the San Francisco Region.  Various clubs rent the track throughout the year for informal high-performance driving schools that allow the public to drive their own cars at speed. The raceway has also played host to prototype testing of the Nissan GT-R in 2007.

The track is featured in video games such as the Gran Turismo series (including the bike version Tourist Trophy), Forza Motorsport, and the MotoGP series.  In a bid to compare real life versus video games, Jeremy Clarkson of the British automotive show Top Gear attempted to beat his Gran Turismo time of 1:41.148 in a Honda NSX by racing the real track in the same car in 2005.  During the trials, Clarkson determined that the game omitted a few details of the track, and the game's physics allowed him to brake later when coming into turns than he could in real life.  As a consequence, he managed a best time of only 1:57 on the real course.  However, both he and the track instructor agreed that it is possible to complete the course in 1:41 in a Honda NSX if the driver were sufficiently experienced, talented, and most importantly fearless.

It was also used in 1976 for the film Herbie Goes to Monte Carlo as a qualifying track.

Other non-automotive events
Laguna Seca and the part of the old Fort Ord that is now Bureau of Land Management land annually host the Sea Otter Classic "Celebration of Cycling". The event has now become the largest cycling festival in the United States, bringing in over 10,000 racers and over 100,000 spectators – and is now the first major event of the year, typically held in April – for both the road bike and mountain bike professional seasons.

Several times each year, bicycles are permitted on the track for 2 hours.  The admission fee is $10 per bicycle rider.

Laguna Seca served as the finish line for Stage 4 of the 2016 Amgen Tour of California and
Stage 3 of the 2018 Amgen Tour of California bicycle races.

The raceway has been occasionally as a venue for concerts and other non-sporting events. The Grateful Dead performed on the racetrack in May 1987; later that night, the band filmed their music video for "Touch of Grey" there.

On September 17, 1987, Pope John Paul II celebrated mass at Laguna Seca Raceway, where 72,000 people had gathered to see him.

In the 1990s, the raceway was the venue for the Laguna Seca Daze music festival, which featured performances from music acts in the folk, alternative rock and jam band genres. Artists who performed at the festival include Bob Dylan, Phish, Blues Traveler, 10,000 Maniacs, Big Head Todd and the Monsters, Meat Puppets, 4 Non Blondes, Jeff Healey, The Allman Brothers Band, Gin Blossoms and Shawn Colvin.

On June 24, 2011, John Mueller of Muellerized Suspension Systems married Sheila Stone on the top of the Corkscrew at Laguna Seca. This is the location where the ashes of Lee Mueller (4-time SCCA National Champion, IMSA GTU Champion, 3-time winner of the 24 Hours of Daytona, and 12 Hours of Sebring winner), John Mueller's father, were spread.

In Spring 2020, due to the COVID-19 pandemic, graduation ceremonies took place at the raceway. Local schools participating included Carmel High School (June 3, 2020) and Pacific Grove High School (May 29, 2020).  After collecting diplomas, graduates and their families were able to drive around the track in celebration.

Races

Major events
IMSA Monterey Grand Prix; 1957–present; SCCA Nationals (2014), USRRC, IMSA GT, American Le Mans Series, Rolex Sports Car Series, IMSA SportsCar Championship
United States motorcycle Grand Prix; 1988–1991, 1993–1994, 2005–2013; MotoGP
Superbike World Championship; 1995–2004, 2013–2019
Monterey Grand Prix; 1960–2004, 2019–present; USAC Road Racing Championship, Can-Am, Formula 5000, IMSA, CART, IndyCar
Marlboro Challenge; 1989, 1991; CART

Other events

A1 Grand Prix

MotoGP

Superbike World Championship

Formula 750 World Championship

AMA Grand National / AMA Road Racing

AMA Superbike / MotoAmerica

Rolex Sports Car Series

Trans-Am

Intercontinental GT Challenge

ARCA Menards Series West

1973, 1975-1977, 1980-81: Race ran in the 1.900 mi road course circuit.
2000-2001: Race ran in the 2.238 mi road course circuit.

Formula One
In 1989, the year following the last Formula One race in Detroit, choices for a new location for the United States Grand Prix came down to Laguna Seca and Phoenix. The aforementioned 1988 improvements to the track were made in part to lure the F1 race. In the final decision, Laguna Seca was thought to be too remote and too small for an F1 crowd, and so Phoenix was granted the Grand Prix.

References

Further reading

"Laguna Seca Raceway: 40 Years Through the Corkscrew: 1957-1997" (David and Mary-Ellen Wright-Rana, 1997) —

External links 

Sea Otter Classic
Trackpedia's guide to driving Laguna Seca
Laguna Seca Street and Race Car Lap Times
Steve McQueen raced at Laguna Seca in 1959
Laguna Seca – A Look Back
1963 course map
Insider tips for visiting Laguna Seca

1957 establishments in California
Champ Car circuits
Buildings and structures in Salinas, California
A1 Grand Prix circuits
Motorsport venues in California
Grand Prix motorcycle circuits
Pacific Grand Prix
Superbike World Championship circuits
American Le Mans Series circuits
IMSA GT Championship circuits
NASCAR tracks
Sports venues in Monterey County, California
Sports venues completed in 1957